Jeff A. Kaufmann (born 9 January 1963) is a former Iowa State Representative from the 79th District. He served in the Iowa House of Representatives from 2004 until his retirement in 2013. He served in House leadership for six years, serving as the assistant minority leader and speaker pro tem.

Education
Kauffman obtained his BA, MA, and Ph.D from the University of Iowa.

Career
Outside politics, Kaufmann is a seventh generation livestock farmer, as well as a professor of history and government at Muscatine Community College, where he has taught courses since 1990.

Kaufmann won his first election to the Iowa House of Representatives by just over 1,000 votes, and was re-elected three times. In 2006, he was reelected with 6,311 votes (62%), defeating Democratic opponent Clara Oleson. In 2008, Kaufmann collected 9,456 votes, easily maintaining his seat. Democrat Rebecca Spears dropped out of the race before election day.

In the Iowa House, Kaufmann was a member of the Administration and Rules committee; the Education committee; the State Government committee; the Ways and Means committee; and the Local Government committee, where he was the ranking member. Kaufmann authored a key anti-eminent domain bill; the Legislature overrode a veto by Democratic Governor Tom Vilsack which was the only override of a Governor's veto in half a century. As a member of the House leadership team, Kaufmann played a key role in recruiting, fundraising, and campaigning for Republican candidate.

In 2014, Kaufmann became chairman of the Republican Party of Iowa. During his tenure, the party enjoyed major successes on the local, state, and federal levels. In his time as chair, the winning control of both chambers of the legislature and the governorship for the first time in almost twenty years. On the federal level, Republicans captured five of six federal offices, while delivering Iowa to the Republican presidential nominee for the first time since 2004.

His previous political experience includes serving as a trustee for Sugar Creek Township, as president of the Wilton School Board, and he currently serves as a Cedar County supervisor.

Personal life
Kaufmann is married to his wife of 36 years, Vicki. Together, they have three sons and one grandson: Bobby (now a state representative), Jacob (a middle school science teacher, coach, and father to Oliver), and John (the former chairman of the Iowa Federation of College Republicans).

References

External links
 Representative Jeff Kaufmann official Iowa General Assembly site
 
Profile at Iowa House Republicans

|-

1963 births
Living people
Republican Party members of the Iowa House of Representatives
People from Wilton, Iowa
Place of birth missing (living people)
State political party chairs of Iowa
21st-century American politicians
University of Iowa alumni